Mike Owusu (born 20 May 1995) is a German-Ghanaian footballer who plays as a forward for 1. FC Düren.

References

External links
 
 

1995 births
Living people
Footballers from Berlin
German footballers
Ghanaian footballers
Association football forwards
Hertha BSC II players
FC Hansa Rostock players
SG Sonnenhof Großaspach players
SC Fortuna Köln players
Regionalliga players
3. Liga players